Emotional Roadshow World Tour (stylized as EMØTIØNAL RØADSHØW WØRLD TØUR) is the fifth concert tour by the American musical duo Twenty One Pilots, in support of their album Blurryface. The tour began on May 31, 2016 in Cincinnati and concluded on June 25, 2017 in Columbus. It consisted of 123 shows, making it the longest tour by the band.

Background and development 
The group announced a bigger tour to further promote Blurryface after they conclude the Blurryface Tour. First tour dates were announced on October 26, 2015, and more dates were announced on May 9, 2016.

The first leg took place in North America across the United States, Canada, and Mexico. The leg ran from May 31, 2016 to October 1, 2016. Rock bands Mutemath and Chef'Special served as the opening acts, with the exception of Mexico City where Camilo Séptimo opened, and Mutemath not opening in Milwaukee who was replaced by Vinyl Theatre. The leg also consisted of festival appearances in Edmonton, Calgary, Atlanta, Las Vegas, and Monterrey. In between August 11, 2016 and September 3, 2016, the band performed in Reading and Leeds for the Reading and Leeds Festivals on August 26 and 27, 2016. The second leg took place across Europe. The leg ran from October 22, 2016 to November 17, 2016. Bry served as the opening act, with the exception of Moscow and Saint Petersburg. The third leg took place back in North America across the United States. The leg ran from January 17, 2017 to March 5, 2017. Jon Bellion and Judah & the Lion served as the opening acts. The fourth leg took place across Oceania. The leg ran from March 24, 2017 until April 8, 2017. Safia served as the opening act. The fifth and final leg of the tour took place back in North America. The leg consisted of three festivals and five shows in their hometown of Columbus, Ohio, dubbed Tour De Columbus.

Set list 
This set list is representative of the show on February 16, 2017, in Anaheim. It is not representative of all concerts for the duration of the tour.

 "Heavydirtysoul" (with "Fairly Local" intro)
 "Migraine"
 "Hometown"
 "Message Man" / "Polarize"
 "Heathens"
 "House of Gold" / "We Don't Believe What's on TV"
 "Can't Help Falling in Love (Elvis Presley cover)
 "Screen" / "The Judge"
 "Lane Boy"
 "Ode to Sleep"
 "Addict With a Pen"
 "Cancer" (My Chemical Romance cover)
 "Holding on to You"
 "Tubthumping" (Chumbawamba cover; with Jon Bellion and Judah & the Lion)
 "No Diggity" (Blackstreet cover; with Jon Bellion and Judah & the Lion)
 "Where Is the Love?" (The Black Eyed Peas cover; with Jon Bellion and Judah & the Lion)
 "Jump Around" (House of Pain cover; with Jon Bellion and Judah & the Lion)
 "Ride"
 "Stressed Out"
 "Guns for Hands"
 "Tear in My Heart"
 "Car Radio"
Encore
 "Goner"
 "Trees"

Shows

Notes

References 

2016 concert tours
2017 concert tours
Twenty One Pilots